The Vital Center: The Politics of Freedom is a 1949 book by Harvard historian Arthur Schlesinger, Jr. It defends liberal democracy and a state-regulated market economy against the totalitarianism of communism and fascism.

Summary

Schlesinger's argument runs as follows: modern man has been detached from his moorings by capitalism and technology. Searching for a new solidarity, he finds this in communism, but it has been really a totalitarian military dictatorship run by the Communist Party since Lenin "exposed Marxist socialism to the play of... influences which divested it of its libertarian elements." Instead of this totalitarian road, a strong and interventionist liberalism is needed, New Deal-style, in the tradition of American leadership in the liberal world order and of the national reforms of Franklin and Theodore Roosevelt. This would be practical and anti-utopian, and would "restore the balance between individual and community."

Academic freedom

Schlesinger writes:  The deeper issue is the freedom of the teacher to teach his subject according to his most responsible understanding of it, and not according to the ukase of a board of trustees, a legislature, a political party, or a foreign country.  He also stated that "unmolested inquiry is essential."  He cites Harvard University president James Bryant Conant:  "A free society must dedicate itself to the protection of the unpopular view."

Editions

Sources

1949 non-fiction books
Political books
Books by Arthur Schlesinger Jr.
Houghton Mifflin books